Khvorchan (also Romanized as Khvorchān, Khowrchān, and Khūrchān; also known as Kharchūn, Khorchūn, and Khorechūn) is a village in Emamzadeh Abdol Aziz Rural District, Jolgeh District, Isfahan County, Isfahan Province, Iran. At the 2006 census, its population was 452, in 133 families.

References 

Populated places in Isfahan County